The Arabo Volunteer Detachment or Arabo Battalion was a paramilitary Armenian volunteer unit during the First Nagorno-Karabakh War, composed of Armenians mainly from Armenia and Karabakh, as well as Armenians from abroad. It was an ARF-affiliated unit.

History 
The group was originally named after Garegin Nzhdeh. However, the emergence of a group called "Garegin Nzhdeh" among other Armenian groups led to the change of the group's name to "Arabo". "Arabo" was the pseudonym of Arakel Mkhitarian, who revolted against the Ottomans in the 19th century and was eventually killed by Kurdish groups. The group was established in Yerevan in October 1989 with the participation of Armenian nationalists from Lebanon, Palestine, Syria and France, as well as experienced officers and servicemen who served in the Soviet Army. On 9 October 1989, the number of members of the group was 24, and on January 19, 1990, the number of members of the group increased with the arrival of groups of 10, 15, 20.

Operations 
At the initial stage, Arabo operated along the Armenia–Azerbaijan border. It took part in the Capture of Garadaghly, where its fighters, together with fighters from the battalion and from other volunteer units, reportedly gathered about three dozen Azerbaijani captives in a ditch and killed them, as a way to "avenge" the death of another comrade the day before, against the orders of Monte Melkonian. Over 80 members of the Arabo Battalion were killed on June 29, 1992 during the Hasangaya Operation in Aghdara (Martakert) conducted by the Ganja Battalion together with the Tartar Territorial Self-Defense Battalion. The fate of the soldiers was unknown in Armenia, and they were considered missing until 2008, when footage from the time of the war appeared on YouTube showing the corpses of the soldiers.

References 

Military units and formations of the First Nagorno-Karabakh War
Armenian militant groups